MPRF may refer to:

 Madheshi Jana Adhikar Forum, Nepal, a political party in Nepal
 Medial pontine reticular formation, a part of the brainstem involved in REM sleep
 Monetary policy reaction function